DFS (DFS Furniture plc, stylised as dfs, is a furniture retailer in the United Kingdom, Spain and Ireland specialising in sofas and soft furnishings. It is listed on the London Stock Exchange.

History

Northern Upholstery 
In 1969, aged 22, Graham Kirkham was married with two children, which he describes as great motivation.

Having visited a few manufacturers in his daily work, he decided that making furniture was relatively easy and that by cutting out the warehouse dealers in the middle of the supply chain, he could sell direct to the public at lower prices. Kirkham rented a room above a snooker hall in Carcroft, and started making furniture upstairs and retailing it downstairs, calling the business Northern Upholstery.

DFS 

In 1983, Kirkham purchased the business and the name of the Darley Dale based DFS Furniture Limited, founded by the Hardy Family in 1963 or 1969. Northern Upholstery was renamed DFS (although some branches of Northern Upholstery in Yorkshire retained their original name until the mid-1990s) and at the time, had a total of sixty three stores, employing 2,000 staff.

In 1993, DFS was floated on the stock market as DFS Furniture Company plc and valued at £271 million, with Kirkham and his family trusts owning just over half of the shares. The group had 21 stores at the time.

This brought the Kirkham family to the attention of thieves, who in 1994, broke into the family home at Sprotbrough while they were on holiday. The burglars bound and gagged the housekeeper and made off with money and jewels worth £2.4 million, later recovered, but still South Yorkshire's largest armed robbery.

In 1998, DFS announced its first drop in profits in twenty eight years to the London Stock Exchange. The company reworked its advertising to feature younger models, and in 2000, DFS announced a 79 percent profit increase. But the revival was short lived, and in light of the continuing prevalence for private equity, Kirkham took the chain private again in 2004, leveraging his family's own 9.46% stake with £150 million of family funds in an eventual £496 million deal.

Kirkham told the Yorkshire Post: "It's something that's caused me fitful sleep in the time I've been thinking about it. I've no hobby, this is my hobby – it's what I do. I'm an entrepreneur. It's almost as if I can feel the adrenaline running through my veins." On 3 April 2010, it was announced that DFS had been sold to private equity firm Advent International for a reported £500 million.

DFS then acquired two smaller British retailers which had been struggling in the market: Sofa Workshop in 2013 and Dwell in August 2014. On 6 March 2015, the company floated on the London Stock Exchange again as DFS Furniture plc. In October 2017, DFS announced they had purchased one of their competitors, Sofology (formerly Sofaworks and CSL) in a £25 million deal.

The acquisition was ratified by the Competition and Markets Authority in November 2017.

Marketing 
For many years in the 1980s and 1990s, actor Tom Adams was the face of DFS's television advertisements. In December 2008, one television commercial by DFS was banned by the Advertising Standards Authority, following complaints that the company had doctored the footage to inflate the perceived size of their sofas, relative to the actors.

The advert featured actors miming Nickelback's "Rockstar", while playing air guitar in front of the sofas. That month, the advert was also given the distinction as one of the worst adverts of all time.

Acquisitions
 Furniture businesses of Wyefield Group (June 1999, £1.5 million)

Sofa Workshop 
Sofa Workshop is a furniture manufacturer and retailer of handmade furniture, offering both product and fabric customisation that DFS acquired in 2013. The furniture is handmade in Britain. As well as sofas and chairs, it also makes a range of accessories including footstools, cushions and made to measure curtains. Formerly based in Lodsworth, West Sussex, United Kingdom, it is now headquartered in Peasmarsh, Surrey.

Sofa Workshop, founded by Andrew Cussins in 1985, opened its first store in Maidstone in 1986. In November 2002, Cussins sold the company to MFI Group for £12.25 million. Seen by many as a poor marriage of brands due to different customer markets when MFI ceased selling lounge furniture, Sofa Workshop was sold.

It was bought in October 2006, by the New Haven Group, which then appointed an administrator in May 2008. At that stage, the company had thirty one stores in England, Scotland and Northern Ireland, employing 160 people. The company had revenue amounting to £30 million in the year ending May 2008.

On 31 December 2008, Sofa Workshop announced Leonard Curtis as a possible administrator. Leonard Curtis stated at the time that there had been expressions of interest in purchasing the company.

It was reported on 31 January 2009 that Sofa Workshop had been sold. Leonard Curtis said ten of the company's thirty stores had been bought by Erewash Upholstery, which is controlled by a consortium of investors led by Andrew Cussins, who founded Sofa Workshop in 1985. Soon after the management buyout, Cussins moved on.

Since the change of ownership, Sofa Workshop has re established itself as a furniture retailer in the United Kingdom, and has seen a 40% increase in profits in the year ending December 2010.

Sofa Workshop Ltd now has twenty shops nationwide including a franchise shop in Chester. They are located in Edinburgh, Glasgow, Exeter, Bath, Bristol, Manchester, Guildford, Chichester, Cambridge, Harrogate, Gateshead, Kingston, Tunbridge Wells, Battersea, Chiswick, Newbury, Oxford, Westfield Stratford City, King's Road, and Tottenham Court Road in London.

In January 2012, they opened a second shop in Battersea, London as a dedicated Clearance Outlet. In October 2013, Sofa Workshop was acquired by DFS. However, it continues to trade as its own distinct business and brand as a part of DFS.

References

External links 
 

Furniture retailers of the United Kingdom
Companies listed on the London Stock Exchange
Companies based in Doncaster
Retail companies established in 1969
1969 establishments in England